McIndoes Reservoir is a  impoundment on the Connecticut River on the boundary between Vermont and New Hampshire in northern New England. The dam forming the reservoir lies between the communities of McIndoe Falls, Vermont, and Monroe, New Hampshire.

McIndoe Falls Dam creating the reservoir was built in 1931 as a project of the New England Electric System, along with the nearby Frank D. Comerford Dam. The McIndoes Station power plant has a capacity of 11 megawatts. Both dams are now owned and operated by TransCanada Corporation.

See also

List of lakes in New Hampshire
List of lakes in Vermont

References 

Barnet, Vermont
Lakes of Grafton County, New Hampshire
Reservoirs in New Hampshire
Reservoirs in Vermont
Lakes of Caledonia County, Vermont
TC Energy dams
Dams completed in 1931